Strangeland or Strange Land may refer to:

Music 
 Strangeland (album), a 2012 album by Keane
 Strange Land, a 1986 album by Box of Frogs
 Strangelands, a 1988 album by The Crazy World of Arthur Brown
 "Strangeland", a 1990 song by Green Day from Sweet Children
 "Strangeland", a 2002 song by Tristesse de la Lune
 "Strangeland", a 2011 song by Tech N9ne from All 6's and 7's

Other
 Strangeland (film), a 1998 American horror film
 Jim Stangeland (born 1921), American football player and coach
 The Strange Land, a novel by Hammond Innes

See also 
 Stranger in a Strange Land (disambiguation)